Kitili Maluki Mwendwa is a former Chief Justice of Kenya. He served between 1968–1971 and was succeeded by Sir James Wicks.

Mwendwa, who was from Kitui, was the first African to become Chief Justice of Kenya. His brother, Ngala Mwendwa, served as Kenya's first Minister of Labour from 1963 to 1974.

See also
 Court of Appeal of Kenya
 High Court of Kenya

References

Year of birth missing (living people)
Living people
20th-century Kenyan judges
Chief justices of Kenya
People from Kitui County